Edmund the Martyr (also known as St Edmund or Edmund of East Anglia, died 20 November 869) was king of East Anglia from about 855 until his death. 

Few historical facts about Edmund are known, as the kingdom of East Anglia was devastated by the Vikings, who destroyed any contemporary evidence of his reign. Coins minted by Edmund indicate that he succeeded Æthelweard of East Anglia, as they shared the same moneyers. He is thought to have been of East Anglian origin, but 12th century writers produced fictitious accounts of his family, succession and his rule as king. Edmund's death was mentioned in the Anglo-Saxon Chronicle, which relates that he was killed in 869 after the Great Heathen Army advanced into East Anglia. Medieval versions of Edmund's life and martyrdom differ as to whether he died in battle fighting the Great Heathen Army, or if he met his death after being captured and then refusing the Viking leaders' demand that he renounce Christ. 

A popular cult emerged after Edmund's death, and he was canonised by the Church. A series of coins commemorating him was minted from around the time East Anglia was absorbed by the kingdom of Wessex in 918, and in about 986, the French monk Abbo wrote of his life and martyrdom. 

During the 10th century, Edmund's remains were translated from an unidentified location in East Anglia to Beodricesworth (modern Bury St Edmunds); they were temporarily moved to London for safekeeping in 1010. Edmund's cult flourished during the Early and High Middle Ages, and he and Edward the Confessor were regarded as the patron saints of medieval England until they were replaced by Saint George in the 15th century. Medieval manuscripts and works of art relating to Edmund include Abbo's Passio Sancti Eadmundi, John Lydgate's 15th-century Life, the Wilton Diptych, and a number of church wall paintings.

King of the East Angles

Accession and rule

The existence of Edmund is known from coins minted by his moneyers, three of whom—Dudda, Eadmund, and Twicga—minted coins for Edmund's predecessor, Æthelweard which suggests that a smooth transition of power occurred. The earliest documentary reference to Edmund is in the 870 annal of the Anglo-Saxon Chronicle compiled 20 years after his death. Nothing is known of his life or reign from contemporary written sources. The devastation in East Anglia that was caused by the Vikings destroyed all the charters that may have referred to Edmund.

Edmund cannot be placed within any ruling dynasty.

A variety of different coins were minted by Edmund's moneyers during his reign. The letters AN, standing for 'Anglia', appear on the coins of only Edmund and Æthelstan, another 9th century king of the East Angles; the letters appear on Edmund's coins as part of the phrase + EADMUND REX AN[GLORUM] ("Edmund, King of the Angles"). Edmund's later coins read + EADMUND REX ("Edmund, King"). Otherwise, no chronology for his coins has been confirmed.

Death and burial
For decades after the Viking raid on Lindisfarne in 793, their attacks on England were mainly raids on isolated monastic communities. By the end of the decade the Vikings had started to over-winter in England. Three thousand men in hundreds of ships arrived off the east coast of England, probably from bases in Ireland. The army's first winter was spent in East Anglia before they moved on, arriving in Northumbria by 866/867. The Great Heathen Army attacked Mercia by the end of 867 and made peaceful terms with the Mercians; a year later the Vikings returned to East Anglia. 

The Anglo-Saxon Chronicle, which generally described few matters relating to the East Angles and their rulers, relates that "here the army rode across Mercia into East Anglia, and took winter-quarters at Thetford; and that winter King Edmund fought against them, and the Danish took the victory, and killed the king and conquered all that land". Where Edmund was killed and whether he died in battle or was murdered by the Danes afterwards is not known. The Great Heathen Army went on to invade Wessex in late 870, where they were confronted by Æthelred of Wessex and his brother, the future Alfred the Great.

Edmund was buried in a wooden chapel near to where he was killed. In 925 Æthelstan founded a religious community to take care of Edmund's shrine.

Memorial coinage

Following the death of the Danish Guthrum, king of East Anglia, in around 890, the same moneyers who had minted his coins started to produce money in commemoration of Edmund. The coins, whose design was based upon those produced during Edmund's reign, provide the earliest evidence that he was venerated as a saint. All the pennies and (more rarely) half-pennies that were produced read SCE EADMVND REX—'O St Edmund the king!'. Some of them have a legend that provides evidence that the Vikings experimented with their initial design.

The St Edmund memorial coins were minted in great quantities by a group of more than 70 moneyers, many of whom appear to have originated from continental Europe; over 1800 specimens were found when the Cuerdale Hoard was discovered in Lancashire in 1840. The coins were widely used within the Danelaw. They have mainly been found in the east of England, but the exact location of any of the mints they came from is not known with certainty, although scholars have assumed that they were made in East Anglia.

Veneration

Cult at Bury St Edmunds
  
Edmund's cult was promoted and flourished, but it declined, with the production of St Edmund coins ceasing after around 910. The saint did not reappear in liturgical calendars from the 9th century until the appearance of Abbo of Fleury's Passio Sancti Eadmundi three centuries later. In 1010, Edmund's remains were translated to London to protect them from the Vikings, where they were kept for three years before being returned to Bury. 

The Danish king Canute, who ruled England from 1016, converted to Christianity and was instrumental in founding the abbey at Bury St Edmunds. The new stone abbey church was completed in 1032, having possibly been commissioned by Canute in time to be consecrated on the 16th anniversary of the Battle of Assandun, which took place on 18 October 1016. Edmund's shrine became one of the most famous and wealthy pilgrimage locations in England. The abbey's power grew upon being given jurisdiction over the western half of the county of Suffolk by the creation in 1044 of the Liberty of Saint Edmund, established by Edward the Confessor, and a larger church was built in 1095, into which Edmund's relics were translated. After the Norman conquest of England in 1066, the abbot planned out over 300 new houses within a grid-iron pattern at a location that was close to the abbey precincts, a development which caused the town to more than double in size. King John is said to have given a great sapphire and a precious stone set in gold to the shrine, which he was permitted to keep upon the condition that it was returned to the abbey when he died.

Edmund's shrine was destroyed in 1539, during the English Reformation. According to a letter (now in British Library's Cotton Collection), the shrine was defaced, and silver and gold to the value of over 5000 marks was taken away. The abbot and his monks were expelled and the abbey was dissolved.

Cult at Toulouse 
In 1664, a lawyer from the French city of Toulouse publicized a claim that Edmund's remains had been taken from Bury by the future Louis VIII of France following his defeat at the Battle of Lincoln in 1217. The relics had then been donated by Louis to the Basilica of Saint-Sernin, Toulouse. The first record of this is a relic list for Saint-Sernin of around 1425, which included St Edmund among the church's relics. 

In 1644, after the city was saved from the plague from 1628 to 1631, which the population ascribed to the intercession of a saint known to the church authorities as Aymundus, who they decided was Edmund. In gratitude for its deliverance, the city vowed to build a new reliquary for the saint's remains. Edmund's cult flourished there for over two centuries. The reliquary, designed by Jean Chalette, was silver and adorned with solid silver statues. In 1644, the relics were verified and catalogued for interment in the newly-completed shrine, by which time the cult's origins had been forgotten. Edmund's shrine was removed in 1794 during the French Revolution. The saint's relics were restored to the Basilica of Saint-Sernin in 1845 and placed in a new reliquary.

Relics at Arundel 

In 1901 the Archbishop of Westminster, Herbert Vaughan, received "certain relics" from the Basilica of Saint-Sernin. The relics, believed at the time to be those of St Edmund, were intended for the high altar of London's Westminster Cathedral, which was then under construction.

The acceptance of the relics required the intercession of Pope Leo XIII, after an initial refusal by the church in France. Upon their arrival in England they were housed in the Fitzalan Chapel at Arundel Castle prior to their translation to Westminster. Although their validity had been confirmed in 1874, when two pieces were given to Edward Manning, Archbishop of Westminster, concerns were raised about the authenticity of the Arundel relics by Montague James and Charles Biggs in The Times. The relics remained at Arundel under the care of the Duke of Norfolk while a historical commission was set up by Cardinal Vaughan and Archbishop Germain of Saint-Sernin. They remain  at Arundel. In 1966 three teeth from the collection of relics from France were given to Douai Abbey in Berkshire.

Commemoration and attributes

The feast day of Edmund, King and Martyr in the Catholic Church is 20 November. He is also remembered in the Church of England, with a Lesser Festival on this day of the year. Edmund's particular attributes are the arrow and the sword, being an English king, his attributes include the orb and sceptre. According to the Oxford Dictionary of Saints, his attribute can also be a wolf.

A stone cross at Hoxne in Suffolk marks one supposed location of Edmund's death. The monument records that it was built on the site of an ancient oak tree which fell in 1848 and was found to have an arrow head embedded in its trunk. Some fifty-five Church of England parish churches are dedicated to Edmund, perhaps the most notable being the Church of St Edmund, King and Martyr, Lombard Street in the City of London. The Benedictine community of Douai Abbey also has Edmund as its patron.

Medieval hagiographies and legends

Passio Sancti Eadmundi 

In about 986, the monks of Ramsey Abbey commissioned Abbo of Fleury to write Edmund's , or account of his martyrdom. According to Abbo, St Dunstan, Archbishop of Canterbury, was the source of the story of the martyrdom, which he had heard told long before, in the presence of Æthelstan, by an old man who swore an oath that he had been Edmund's sword-bearer.

In Abbo's version of events, the king refused to meet the Danes in battle, preferring to die a martyr's death. According to Ridyard, Edmund's martyrdom cannot be proven and the nature of his fate—whether he died fighting or was murdered after the battle—cannot be read from the Anglo-Saxon Chronicle. Ridyard notes that the story that Edmund had an armour-bearer implies that he would have been a warrior king who was prepared to fight the Vikings on the battlefield, but she acknowledges the possibility that such later accounts belong to "the realm of hagiographical fantasy".

Abbo named one of Edmund's killers as Hinguar, who can probably be identified with Ivarr inn beinlausi (Ivar the Boneless), son of Ragnar Lodbrok. After describing the horrific manner of Edmund's death, the  continued the story. His severed head was thrown into the wood. As Edmund's followers searched for him, calling out "Where are you, friend?" the head answered,  ("Here! Here! Here!") until at last they found it, clasped between a wolf's paws, protected from other animals and uneaten. The followers then recovered the head.

Upon exhumation of the body, a miracle was discovered. All the arrow wounds upon Edmund's undecayed corpse had healed and his head was reattached. The last recorded inspection of the body whilst at Bury St Edmunds was in 1198.

The resemblance between the deaths of St Sebastian and St Edmund was remarked upon by Abbo: both saints were attacked by archers, although only Edmund is supposed to have been decapitated. His death bears some resemblance to the fate suffered by other saints: St Denis was whipped and beheaded and the body of Mary of Egypt was said to have been guarded by a lion. The English medievalist Antonia Gransden described Abbo's Passio as "little more than a hotch-potch of hagiographical commonplaces" and argues that Abbo's ignorance of what actually happened to Edmund would have led him to use aspects of the Lives of well-known saints such as Sebastian and Denis as models for his version of Edmund's martydom. Gransden acknowledged that there are some aspects of the story—such as the appearance of the wolf that guards Edmund's head—that do not have exact parallels elsewhere.

Miracles of St Edmund
Herman the Archdeacon, who was an excellent Latinist, wrote another hagiography of Edmund, the Miracles of St Edmund, at the end of the eleventh century. His original text does not survive, but a shortened version is part of a book dating to around 1100 produced by Bury St Edmunds Abbey, which is composed of Abbo's hagiography, followed by Herman's. The hagiographer and musician, Goscelin, soon afterwards produced a revised version of Herman's Miracles, which was hostile to Herman personally. Both versions are printed and translated by Tom Licence.

Other legends 

De Infantia Sancti Edmundi, a fictitious 12th-century hagiography of Edmund's early life by the English canon Geoffrey of Wells, represented him as the youngest son of 'Alcmund', a Saxon king of Germanic descent. 'Alcmund' may never have existed. Edmund's fictitious continental origins were later elaborated upon in the 15th century by the poet John Lydgate in his The Lives of Saints Edmund and Fremund. Lydgate spoke of his parentage, his birth at Nuremberg, his adoption by Offa of Mercia, his nomination as successor to the king and his landing at Old Hunstanton on the North Norfolk coast to claim his kingdom. 

At that time  functioned as the royal capital. Biographical details of Edmund in the Catholic Encyclopedia, published in 1913, include that "he showed himself a model ruler from the first, anxious to treat all with equal justice, and closing his ears to flatterers and untrustworthy informers". It was written that he withdrew for a year to his royal tower at Hunstanton and learned the whole Psalter, so that he could recite it from memory.

Edmund may have been killed at Hoxne, in Suffolk. His martyrdom is mentioned in a charter that was written when the church and chapel at Hoxne were granted to Norwich Priory in 1101. Place-name evidence has been used to link the name of Hoxne with Haegelisdun, named by Abbo of Fleury as the site of Edmund's martyrdom, but this evidence is dismissed by the historian Peter Warner. The association of Edmund's cult with the village has continued into modern times. Dernford in Cambridgeshire, and Bradfield St Clare (near Bury St Edmunds) are other possible sites for where Edmund was martyred. In a preface to Lydgate's Life, in which Edmund's banner—depicting three crowns set on a blue background—is described, the crowns are said to represent Edmund's martyrdom, virginity and kingship.

The ancient wooden St Andrew's Church, Greensted-juxta-Ongar in Essex, is said to have been a resting place for his body on the way to Bury St Edmunds in 1013.

Patronages 
Edmund is the patron saint of pandemics as well as kings, the Roman Catholic diocese of East Anglia, and Douai Abbey. England did not ever have a single patron saint before the Tudor period; during the Middle Ages, several saints were considered to have a close association with England and to be nationally important: St Edmund; St Gregory the Great; St Edward the Confessor; St Thomas Becket; and St George. Of these saints, Edmund was the most consistently popular with English kings, although Edward III raised the importance of George when he associated him with the Order of the Garter. 

In 2006, BBC Radio Suffolk radio presenter Mark Murphy and David Ruffley, the Member of Parliament for Bury St Edmunds, failed in their campaign to reinstate Edmund as the patron saint of England.
In 2013, BBC News reported a new campaign launched by Murphy and the brewer Greene King, which is based in Bury St Edmunds, to reinstate St Edmund as England's patron saint. Supporters of the campaign stated their hopes that a petition could be used to force Parliament to debate the issue.

In art 

The veneration of Edmund throughout the centuries has created a legacy of noteworthy works of art. An illustrated copy of Abbo of Fleury's Passio Sancti Eadmundi, made at Bury St Edmunds in around 1130, is now kept at the Morgan Library in New York City. The copy of John Lydgate's 15th-century Life, written for Henry VI of England, is held at the British Library. The Wilton Diptych was painted during the reign of Richard II of England and is the most famous representation of Edmund in art. Painted on oak panels, it shows Edmund and Edward the Confessor as the royal patrons of England presenting Richard to the Virgin and Child. The poet John Lydgate (13701451), who lived all his life in Bury St Edmunds, presented his twelve-year-old king Henry VI of England with a long poem (now known as Metrical Lives of Saints Edmund and Fremund) when Henry came to the town in 1433 and stayed at the abbey for four months. The book is now kept by the British Library in London. Edmund's martyrdom features on several medieval wall-paintings to be found in churches across England.

The saint features in a romantic poem, Athelston, whose 15th-century author is unknown. In the climactic scene of the poem, Edyff, the sister of King 'Athelston' of England, gives birth to Edmund after passing through a ritual ordeal by fire.

See also
List of Catholic saints
Ragener - reputedly a relative of St Edmund, who shared in his martyrdom.

Notes

Footnotes

Sources

Further reading

External links 

 
 Illuminated manuscripts depicting Edmund, from the British Library:
- Harley 1766 (The Fall of Princes)
- Royal 2 B VI (Psalter and Canticles 13th century)
 Here Followeth The Life of S. Edmund in Caxton's translation of The Golden Legend from the Christian Iconography website
 Images and information about the Passio Sancti Eadmundi at the Morgan Library & Museum, New York
 The Relics of St. Edmund: The Little Box from Toulouse by Michael P. Peyton from the Saints and Relics website
 Passio Sancti Edmundi Regis et Martyris by Abbo of Fleury, from The Latin Library (in Latin) 
 Drawing of the model for the reliquary of St Edmund by Jean Chalette

9th-century births
869 deaths
Anglo-Saxon warriors
East Anglian saints
Bury St Edmunds
East Anglian monarchs
9th-century Christian saints
9th-century Christian martyrs
9th-century English monarchs
Pre-Reformation Anglican saints
Anglican saints